Javier Sánchez and Todd Woodbridge were the defending champions, but Woodbridge did not participate this year.  Sánchez partnered Diego Nargiso, losing in the quarterfinals.

Jacco Eltingh and Paul Haarhuis won the title, defeating Sergio Casal and Emilio Sánchez 6–3, 6–4 in the final.

Seeds

Draw

Draw

References
Draw

OTB Open
1992 ATP Tour